This is a list of freshwater fish pursued by recreational anglers.

 Alligator gar
 American paddlefish
 Amur catfish
 Arapaima
 Arctic grayling
 Asian arowana
 Asp (fish)
 Australian grayling
 Bagarius yarrelli
 Barramundi
 Basa (fish)
 Australian bass
 Largemouth bass
 Smallmouth bass
 Spotted bass
 Striped bass
 Bayad
 Beluga (sturgeon)
 Biara
 Black arowana
 Black bullhead
 Black carp
 Black crappie
 River blackfish
 Blicca bjoerkna
 Blue catfish
 Bluegill
 Boulengerella cuvieri
 Bowfin
 Brachymystax lenok
 Brook trout
 Brown bullhead
 Brown trout
 Bull trout
 Burbot
 Channel catfish
 Firewood catfish
 Flathead catfish
 Mekong giant catfish
 Channa marulius
 Channa micropeltes
 Channa striata
 Chinese sturgeon
 Cichla intermedia
 Cichla monoculus
 Cichla ocellaris
 Cichla orinocensis
 Cichla temensis
 Clarias gariepinus
 Clown featherback
 Coastal cutthroat trout
 Murray cod
 Sleepy cod
 Trout cod
 Colorado pikeminnow
 Common barbel
 Common bream
 Cutthroat trout
 Eastern freshwater cod
 Eel-tailed catfish
 Elopichthys bambusa
 European perch
 Florida gar
 Giant barb
 Giant kōkopu
 Giant pangasius
 Gilded catfish
 Golden mandarin fish
 Goldeye
 Green sturgeon
 Green sunfish
 Gymnarchus
 Hemibagrus wyckioides
 Hepsetus cuvieri
 Hiodon tergisus
 Hoplias aimara
 Hoplias malabaricus
 Huchen
 Hucho taimen
 Humpback mahseer
 Hybrid striped bass
 Hydrocynus goliath
 Hydrocynus tanzaniae
 Hydrocynus vittatus
 Hydrolycus armatus
 Hydrolycus tatauaia
 Ide (fish)
 Iridescent shark
 Japanese sturgeon
 Kaluga (fish)
 Kampango
 Lake sturgeon
 Largemouth yellowfish
 Longnose gar
 Mayaheros urophthalmus
 Moggel
 Mongolian redfin
 Mooneye
 Muskellunge
 Redhook myleus
 Nelma
 Northern pikeminnow
 Northern snakehead
 Oncorhynchus masou
 Oxydoras niger
 Pangasius pangasius
 Papermouth
 Parachromis dovii
 Payara
 Golden perch
 Macquarie perch
 Nile perch
 Yellow perch
 Phalacronotus apogon
 Chain pickerel
 Amur pike
 Northern pike
 Pinirampus
 Porthole shovelnose catfish
 Predatory carp
 Pseudoplatystoma fasciatum
 Pseudoplatystoma reticulatum
 Pseudoplatystoma tigrinum
 Pumpkinseed
 Rainbow trout
 Red-bellied piranha
 Redbreast sunfish
 Redear sunfish
 Redeye piranha
 Redtail catfish
 Rita rita
 Rock bass
 Russian sturgeon
 Sacramento pikeminnow
 Salminus brasiliensis
 Salmo marmoratus
 Salmo obtusirostris
 Atlantic salmon
 Chinook salmon
 Chum salmon
 Coho salmon
 Pink salmon
 Salvelinus leucomaenis
 Sauger
 Scleropages jardinii
 Siberian sturgeon
 Silonia silondia
 Silurus soldatovi
 Silver arowana
 Siniperca chuatsi
 Smallmouth buffalo
 Smallmouth yellowfish
 Sockeye salmon
 Sperata seenghala
 Spotted galaxias
 Squalius cephalus
 Sterlet
 Atlantic sturgeon
 Sakhalin taimen
 Tambaqui
 Tench
 Texas cichlid
 Tiger muskellunge
 Tor putitora
 Tor tor
 Dolly Varden trout
 Vundu
 Wallago attu
 Walleye
 Warmouth
 Wels catfish
 White bass
 White crappie
 White perch
 White sturgeon
 Yellow bass
 Yellow bullhead
 Clanwilliam yellowfish
 Zander

References

See also
Game fish
List of marine game fish

 Game
 Freshwater
Game, Freshwater
Fish